Sohn Jiin (born 23 December 2006) is an individual South Korean rhythmic gymnast. She is the silver medalist at the 2022 Korean Senior National championships, and was the two years before the Korean junior national champion.

Career

Sohn began her gymnastics career at age 6, when she was in kindergarten. She quickly showed potential in the sport as she won multiple competitions ahead of her older peers.

Junior career

In her first junior year, she won gold with ribbon at the Korean national competition "Cup of President". She participated at the Aeon Cup in Tokyo along two seniors gymnasts, Kim Chae-woon and Lim Se-eun, representing Sejong & Bongeun RG : they finished 6th in the qualification round.
The following year, she became the junior national champion and went on to compete at the Moscow Grand Prix, where she placed 10th in the team event. She obtained a total score of 60, her best score being 15.15 with ball.
In her last junior year, she maintaned her national title. Internationally, she participated at the IT Sofia Cup, finishing 8th in the all-around and qualifying in the clubs final. She also participated at the FIG Gracia Fair Cup in Hungary, where she won the bronze medal in the all-around. At the national Cup of President, she won 4 gold medals, including the all-around.

Senior

She debuted as a senior at the Korean national senior championships : she won the silver medal behind Kim Joo-won. She participated at the competition with broken ribs, making it hard to compete.

Routine music information

References

2006 births
Living people
South Korean rhythmic gymnasts
21st-century South Korean women
Gymnasts from Seoul